Three Forbidden Stories is a 1952 Italian drama film directed by Augusto Genina.

Cast
 Lia Amanda as Renata
 Antonella Lualdi as Anna Maria
 Eleonora Rossi Drago as Gianna Aragona
 Isa Pola as Signora Paola, mère de Renata
 Frank Latimore as Walter 
 Gabriele Ferzetti as Mario
 Giulio Stival as Comm. Borsani
 Roberto Risso as Bernardo 
 Charles Fawcett as Mottaroni 
 Mariolina Bovo as Mimma
 Enrico Luzi as Tommaso 
 Marcella Rovena as mother of Gianna
 Richard McNamara as Donato

External links
 

1951 films
1950s Italian-language films
Films directed by Augusto Genina
Italian drama films
1951 drama films
Italian black-and-white films
1950s Italian films